

Key Dates

 26 May 2008 - Ruud Krol leaves Zamalek.
 4 June 2008 - Besheer El-Tabei, Tarek El-Sayed, Magdy Atwa, Khaled Saad, Wael Zenga and Ahmed Hossam leaves Zamalek.
 6 June 2008 - Hazem Emam retired.
 9 June 2008 - Zamalek sign Ayman Abdelaziz from Trabzonspor for four years.
 10 June 2008 - Zamalek sign Amir Azmy from Hacettepe Spor Kulübü for four years.
 12 June 2008 - Zamalek sign Amr Adel from El-Jaish for three years.
 21 June 2008 - Zamalek name Reiner Hollmann as new manager.
 24 June 2008 - Amir Azmy leaves Zamalek.
 2 July 2008 - Zamalek buy Junior Agogo from Nottingham Forest for $2.5 million.
 10 July 2008 - Mohammed Helmy leaves Zamalek.
 11 July 2008 - Zamalek name Tarek Yehia as new assistant manager.
 12 July 2008 - Zamalek buy Hany Said from Ismaily for $1.5 million.
 24 July 2008 - Zamalek sign Ricardo Alves Fernandes for free.

Team Kit

The team kits for the 2008-09 season are produced by Adidas. The home kit was revealed at Zamalek TV website on April 4. The kit was first worn in the first CAF Champions League game of the 2007-08 season. An all-black kit with white stripes replaced the bright-yellow away kit from the 2006-07 season.

Squad

Youth Squad

 (Youth)
 (Youth)
 (Youth)
 (Youth)
 (Youth)
 (Youth)
 (Youth)
 (Youth)
 (Youth)

Transfers

In

Out

Loaned out

Overall

This section displays the club's financial expenditure's in the transfer market. Because all transfer fee's are not disclosed to the public, the numbers displayed in this section are only based on figures released by media outlets.

Spending
Summer:   £1,833,130

Winter:   £474,151

Total:    £2,307,281

Income
Summer:   £1,553,022

Winter:   £0

Total:   £1,553,022

Expenditure
Summer:  £280,108

Winter:  £474,151

Total:  £754,259

Statistics

Appearances and goals

Top scorers
Includes all competitive matches. The list is sorted by shirt number when total goals are equal.

Last updated on 11 August

Disciplinary record
Includes all competitive matches. Players with 1 card or more included only.

Last updated on 30 May

*  = 1 suspension withdrawn ** = 2 suspensions withdrawn*** = 3 suspensions withdrawn

Overall

Competitions
Correct as of 27 Sep 2008

League table

League matches

Cup matches

Super Cup match

CAF Champions League

Group table

Matches table

Matches

References

External links
Zamalek - The Official Website
Zamalek Sporting Club "English"

Zamalek SC seasons
Zamalek